Jan Vojáček (born 28 December 1981, in the Czech Republic) is a Czech retired footballer who now works as a doctor at the Institute of Functional Medicine in his home country.

Career

Vojáček started his senior career with SK Sigma Olomouc, where he made eighteen league appearances and scored zero goals. After the, he played for Slovak club Spartak Trnava, Czech club Vysočina Jihlava and Scottish club Dumbarton before retiring in 2010.

He signed for Dumbarton in August 2009, extending his contract in December 2009 until the end of the 2009–10 season. He made 26 league appearances for the club, before being released at the end of the season.

In October 2020 dr. Vojáček received silver Erratic Boulder anti-award in category of individuals for year 2019 from Czech Skeptics' Club Sisyfos „for bold redefinition of epigenetics and almost successful rediscovery of the basic curriculum of normal and pathological physiology“.

References 

Living people
1981 births
Czech footballers
Expatriate footballers in Slovakia
Expatriate footballers in Scotland
SK Sigma Olomouc players
Association football goalkeepers
Czech expatriate footballers
FC Spartak Trnava players
FC Vysočina Jihlava players
Dumbarton F.C. players
Czech expatriate sportspeople in Slovakia
Czech expatriate sportspeople in Scotland
Czech First League players
Scottish Football League players
Czech physicians